Chris Boden (born 13 October 1973) is an English former professional footballer.

Boden was a trainee at Aston Villa, where he made just one senior appearance. He also played for Barnsley, Derby County, Shrewsbury Town and Hereford United.

He retired from professional football after suffering a knee injury.

External links

1973 births
Living people
Footballers from Wolverhampton
English footballers
Aston Villa F.C. players
Barnsley F.C. players
Derby County F.C. players
Shrewsbury Town F.C. players
Hereford United F.C. players
Premier League players
English Football League players
Association football defenders